Kafr Halawa A village in the center of Atfih, Giza Governorate, located in Egypt. According to the statistics for the year 2020, the total population reached 13,757 people, 6,932 men and 6,525 women.

See also 

 Timeline of the 2011 Egyptian revolution since the resignation of Mubarak.

References 

Populated places in Giza Governorate
Cities in ancient Egypt